Dinar Anvarovich Sharipov (born 15 September 1966) is a Russian professional football coach and a former player. He works as an administrator with the Under-21 squad of FC Krylia Sovetov Samara.

Playing career
He made his professional debut in the Soviet First League in 1987 for FC Krylia Sovetov Kuybyshev.

He made his Russian Premier League debut for Krylia Sovetov on 29 March 1992  in a game against FC Spartak Moscow and spent three seasons in the top level with the club.

Personal life
His son Albert Sharipov is a professional footballer.

References

1966 births
Living people
Soviet footballers
Russian footballers
Association football midfielders
Russian Premier League players
PFC Krylia Sovetov Samara players
FC Lada-Tolyatti players
FC Neftyanik Ufa players
FC Neftekhimik Nizhnekamsk players
FC Rotor Volgograd players
FC Nosta Novotroitsk players